The McCormick Tribune Campus Center (MTCC) is a building on the main campus of the Illinois Institute of Technology, in the Bronzeville neighborhood on the south side of Chicago.  The McCormick Tribune Campus Center opened September 30, 2003. A single-story  building, it was the first building designed by architect Rem Koolhaas within the United States.

History
Design of the building began in 1997 during an international architectural design competition hosted by the school. Finalists included Peter Eisenman, Helmut Jahn, Zaha Hadid, Kazuyo Sejima, and the winner, Rem Koolhaas. He worked with Chicago architecture firm Holabird & Root, especially on structural engineering issues.

The site was previously a heavily used student parking lot with tracks of the Green Line passing overhead.  Koolhaas tracked movements of students across the lot, which led to diagonal passageways as the center's interior thoroughfares. Campus functions which had been spread around campus, such as the student bookstore and a post office, were relocated between these pathways.  They also connected to a new cafeteria in a renovated 1953 Commons building designed by Ludwig Mies van der Rohe. Creating this connection involved battles with believers in the purity of Mies's designs who wished the Commons to continue to stand alone.

A major design challenge was the noise of the Green Line tracks passing over the lot. The solution was to enclose a  section of the tracks in a stainless steel tube passing over the building. The tube's support structure is completely independent of the building's, to minimize vibration passing between them.

Even grander plans had once been in store for this site. Koolhaas's firm, the Office for Metropolitan Architecture hoped to develop a retail corridor along 33rd Street, at the southern edge of the lot. Budget constraints precluded this, however. Original designs included a bowling alley, basketball courts and a skate park, but these were removed from the final design, supposedly because of security concerns.

The original project budget was $25 million, but the ultimate cost was $48 million. However, the university wanted an architecturally significant building to add onto its original main campus, which is home to the densest concentration of buildings designed by Ludwig Mies van der Rohe in the world. One month earlier, a residence hall designed by Helmut Jahn a block away made this the second in a set of modern buildings to open on IIT's campus, the first new buildings since 1971.

 
Student reception of the building has been lukewarm. While it does provide much needed space for student organization offices and meeting space the design of the building has many functional difficulties, particularly loud levels of noise throughout the building.

Program
The building serves as a central hub for student life on campus. , it housed the campus mail room, dining facilities, a coffee shop, 7-11 convenience store, the Campus Information Center, the Office of Student Life, and many meeting spaces and offices.  Thanks to its proximity to Shimer College, which is located nearby on the IIT campus, the building also frequently hosts Shimer events.

In popular culture 
A photograph of the train tube was used in the splash screen for AutoCAD 2008.

References

External links

Official IIT website for the MTCC
Description and construction photo gallery
Photos of completed structure
Office for Metropolitan Architecture, principal: Rem Koolhaas
High-resolution 360° Panoramas and Images of McCormick Tribune Campus Center | Art Atlas

Illinois Institute of Technology
School buildings completed in 2003
Buildings and structures in Chicago
Deconstructivism
Modernist architecture in Illinois
Rem Koolhaas buildings
Student activity centers in the United States
2003 establishments in Illinois